Thomas County is a county located in the U.S. state of Georgia. As of the 2020 census the population was 45,798. The county seat is Thomasville.

Thomas County comprises the Thomasville, GA Micropolitan Statistical Area.

History
Thomas County was created by an act of the Georgia General Assembly on December 23, 1825, from portions of Decatur and Irwin Counties. Colquitt (1856), Brooks (1858), and Grady (1905) Counties all were formed partially from lands within Thomas County's original borders.

The county is named for Jett Thomas, an officer in the War of 1812 who is also known for overseeing the construction of the first building at the University of Georgia (originally referred to as Franklin College and known today as Old College) as well as the state capital at Milledgeville.

Geography

The northwestern half of Thomas County, bordered by U.S. Route 319 southwest of Thomasville, and a line that ends up bisecting the distance between Coolidge and Pavo in the northeast, is located in the Upper Ochlockonee River sub-basin of the larger Ochlockonee River basin. The northeastern edge of the county, from north of Pavo to Boston, is located in the Withlacoochee River sub-basin of the Suwannee River basin. The southeastern portion of Thomas County, running southeast from Thomasville, is located in the Aucilla River sub-basin of the larger Aucilla-Waccasassa basin. Almost all of the southwestern portion of the county is located in the Apalachee Bay-St. Marks sub-basin of the Ochlockonee River basin, with the exception of the tiny southwesternmost corner, which is located in the Lower Ochlockonee River sub-basin of the same Ochlockonee River basin.

The Aucilla River rises in Thomas County. The Red Hills Region is centered on Thomas County.

Major highways

  U.S. Route 19
  U.S. Route 84
  U.S. Route 84 Business
  U.S. Route 319
  State Route 3
  State Route 3 Alternate
  State Route 33
  State Route 35
  State Route 35 Connector
  State Route 38
  State Route 38 Business
  State Route 111
  State Route 122
  State Route 188
  State Route 202
  State Route 300

Adjacent counties
 Colquitt County - northeast
 Brooks County - east
 Jefferson County, Florida - south
 Leon County, Florida - southwest
 Grady County - west
 Mitchell County - northwest

Demographics

2000 census
As of the census of 2000, there were 44,737 people, 16,309 households, and 11,465 families living in the county.  The population density was 78 people per square mile (30/km2).  There were 18,285 housing units at an average density of 33 per square mile (13/km2).  The racial makeup of the county was 58.98% White, 38.86% Black or African American, 0.29% Native American, 0.41% Asian, 0.06% Pacific Islander, 0.54% from other races, and 0.85% from two or more races.  1.72% of the population were Hispanic or Latino of any race.

There were 16,309 households, out of which 32.70% had children under the age of 18 living with them, 47.90% were married couples living together, 18.40% had a female householder with no husband present, and 29.70% were non-families. 25.80% of all households were made up of individuals, and 10.60% had someone living alone who was 65 years of age or older.  The average household size was 2.55 and the average family size was 3.06.

In the county, the population was spread out, with 27.10% under the age of 18, 8.10% from 18 to 24, 28.20% from 25 to 44, 22.90% from 45 to 64, and 13.70% who were 65 years of age or older.  The median age was 36 years. For every 100 females there were 88.90 males.  For every 100 females age 18 and over, there were 84.80 males.

As of 2007, the median income for a household in the county was $40,498, and the median income for a family was $52,392. Males had a median income of $28,395 versus $21,344 for females. The per capita income for the county was $21,540.  About 13.60% of families and 17.40% of the population were below the poverty line, including 21.90% of those under age 18 and 19.30% of those age 65 or over.

2010 census
As of the 2010 United States Census, there were 44,720 people, 17,573 households, and 11,999 families living in the county. The racial makeup of the county was 59.6% white, 36.9% black or African American, 0.7% Asian, 0.4% American Indian, 1.2% from other races, and 1.2% from two or more races. Those of Hispanic or Latino origin made up 2.9% of the population. In terms of ancestry, 15.5% were American, 9.0% were English, 8.2% were Irish, and 6.4% were German.

Of the 17,573 households, 33.8% had children under the age of 18 living with them, 45.2% were married couples living together, 18.3% had a female householder with no husband present, 31.7% were non-families, and 27.2% of all households were made up of individuals. The average household size was 2.50 and the average family size was 3.03. The median age was 39.6 years.

The median income for a household in the county was $35,797 and the median income for a family was $46,333. Males had a median income of $38,520 versus $27,085 for females. The per capita income for the county was $21,261. About 17.1% of families and 22.8% of the population were below the poverty line, including 31.2% of those under age 18 and 12.9% of those age 65 or over.

2020 census

As of the 2020 United States Census, there were 45,798 people, 17,595 households, and 12,161 families residing in the county.

Education
 Thomas University
 Southern Regional Technical College
 Thomasville City School District
 Thomas County School District
 Brookwood School

Communities

Cities
 Barwick (partly in Brooks County)
 Boston
 Coolidge
 Meigs (partly in Mitchell County)
 Pavo (partly in Brooks County)
 Thomasville

Town
 Ochlocknee

Unincorporated community
 Metcalf

Politics
Similar to other Georgia counties on the Florida border, the county is very Republican in presidential elections, having last voted for a Democrat in 1980 when the Democrat was Favorite son Jimmy Carter.

See also

 National Register of Historic Places listings in Thomas County, Georgia
List of counties in Georgia

References

External links
 Thomas County
 University of Georgia Thomas County Cooperative Extension Website
 Thomasville Landmarks - Historic preservation organization
 Thomas County Historical Society & Museum of History

 
Georgia (U.S. state) counties
1825 establishments in Georgia (U.S. state)
Populated places established in 1825